Dongalunnaru Jaagratha is a 2022 Indian Telugu-language survival crime thriller film directed by Sathish Tripura and, produced by Suresh Productions and Guru Films. Dongalunnaru Jaagratha features Simha Koduri, Samuthirakani and Preethi Asrani in primary roles. The film is influenced by the Spanish film 4x4 (2019).

Plot 
Raju is a small time thief who hides his identity from his wife, Neeraja. One day, he goes to a car theft and gets stuck in the car. He tries all ways to get out of the car but fails. How will he get out of the car? Who trapped him in the car? What is his motive? These questions form the plot.

Cast 
Simha Koduri as Raju 
Samuthirakani as Chakravarthi
Preethi Asrani as Neeraja
Srikanth Iyengar as cop

Reception 
A critic from The Times of India wrote that "Dongalunnaru Jagratha is an interesting attempt in the genre of survival mystery" and added that the film was "thought-provoking". A critic from 123Telugu said that "On the whole, Dongallunaru Jagartta has a decent premise but is marred by lack of gripping thrills and moving emotions".

References

External links 

 

2022 films
2020s Telugu-language films
Indian survival films
2022 crime thriller films
Indian crime thriller films
Films shot in Hyderabad, India
Films set in Hyderabad, India
Suresh Productions films
Films scored by Kaala Bhairava